Riachuelo is a neighborhood in the North Zone of Rio de Janeiro, Brazil.

Neighbourhoods in Rio de Janeiro (city)